Orthonyx hypsilophus  is an extinct species of logrunner from the Late Pleistocene of Australia. The bird was larger than any of its living congeners. The specific epithet hypsilophus derives from the Greek νψι (“high”), and λοθοϛ (“crest” or “ridge”) with reference to the comparatively high median dorsal ridge of the pelvis.

References

hypsilophus
Pleistocene birds
Quaternary birds of Australia
Birds described in 1985
Fossil taxa described in 1985